King Henry's Drive tram stop is a light rail stop serving the Betchworth Way residential area of New Addington, in the London Borough of Croydon in the southern suburbs of London. It is located in the wide central reservation of a dual carriageway.

Services
King Henry's Drive is served by tram services operated by Tramlink. The tram stop is served by trams every 7-8 minutes between New Addington and  via  and Centrale.

During the evenings on weekends, the service is reduced to a tram every 15 minutes.

Services are operated using Bombardier CR4000 and Stadler Variobahn Trams.

Connections
The stop is served by London Buses routes 64 and 130 which provide connections to New Addington,  Addington Village, Croydon Town Centre and Thornton Heath.

Free interchange for journeys made within an hour is available between bus services and between buses and trams is available at King Henry's Drive as part of Transport for London's Hopper Fare.

References

External links

King Henry's Drive tram stop – Live departures and timetables at Transport for London

Tramlink stops in the London Borough of Croydon